The Utu Utu Gwaitu Paiute Tribe of the Benton Paiute Reservation, also known as the Benton Paiute Tribe, is a federally recognized Great Basin tribe in Mono County, California.

Reservation

The Utu Utu Gwaitu Paiute Tribe has a federal reservation in Mono County,  from the Nevada border called the Benton Paiute Reservation in Benton, California. The reservation is  large that is held in Trustee status and another 67 acres held in fee simple status. Approximately 50 tribal members on the reservation. The reservation was established on July 22, 1915. The tribe owns and operates the Benton Crossing Cafe in nearby Benton, California. About the same distance to the west is Mammoth Lakes, although there is no direct road leading there.

Government
The tribe's headquarters is located in Benton, California. The tribe is governed by a democratically elected, five-person tribal council.

The tribe identifies as being Owens Valley Paiute. Tribal enrollment is open to people with one-quarter Paiute blood quantum, either from the Benton area or descended from original enrollees. Other Owens Valley Paiute can be adopted into the tribe, as approved by a five-person enrollment committee.

The current tribal administration is as follows:

Chairwoman: Tina Braithwaite
Vice-Chairman: Shane Saulque
Secretary/Treasurer: Vacant
Council Person: Michelle Saulque
Council Member: Cecil Rambeau
Chief Arbitrator: Joseph Saulque

At the beginning of 2010, the tribe was awarded a $200,000 grant from the US Department of Energy for a study of the feasibility of geothermal energy development on tribal lands.

History
The tribe unanimously voted on their constitution on November 22, 1975 and ratified it on January 20, 1976.

Name
The name Utuʼutuwi·tu, a subgroup of Owens Valley Paiute (or Eastern Mono), was Anglicized to Utu Utu Gwaiti, or Gwaitu.

Education
The reservation is served by the Eastern Sierra Unified School District.

Citations

General and cited references 
 Liljeblad, Sven and Fowler, Catherine S. "Owens Valley Paiute." Handbook of North American Indians: Great Basin, Volume 11. Washington, DC: Smithsonian Institution, 1986. .
 Pritzker, Barry M. A Native American Encyclopedia: History, Culture, and Peoples. Oxford: Oxford University Press, 2000. .
Rusco, Elmer R. and Mary K. Rusco. "Tribal Politics." Handbook of North American Indians: Great Basin, Volume 11. Washington, DC: Smithsonian Institution, 1986. .

External links
Benton Paiute Tribe, official website

Federally recognized tribes in the United States
Mono tribe
Native American tribes in California
Paiute
Timbisha